CapitaLand is a Singaporean headquartered company focusing on investment, development and management of real estate. It is one of Asia's largest real estate companies and the owner and manager of a global portfolio comprising integrated developments, shopping malls, lodging, offices, homes, business parks, industrial and logistics assets, as well as real estate investment trusts (REITs) and funds.

Present across more than 260 cities in over 30 countries, the company focuses on Singapore and China as its core markets while it continues to expand in markets such as India, Vietnam, Australia, Europe and the USA. CapitaLand has one of the largest investment management businesses globally, with a stable of six listed real estate investment trusts (REITs) and business trusts, as well as about 30 private funds. Since it pioneered REITs in Singapore with the listing of CapitaLand Mall Trust (now merged with CapitaLand Commercial Trust to form CapitaLand Integrated Commercial Trust) in 2002, CapitaLand's portfolio of REITs has expanded to include Ascendas Real Estate Investment Trust, Ascott Residence Trust, CapitaLand China Trust, Ascendas India Trust and CapitaLand Malaysia Trust.

In August 2021, CapitaLand's shareholders voted in favour for the company to restructure its business to form two distinct entities; CapitaLand Investment (CLI), its real estate investment management business; and CapitaLand Development, its privately held property development arm. Later on 20 September, CLI debuted on the Singapore Stock Exchange under the trading name CapitaLandInvest and stock code, 9CI.

History 
On 12 July 2000, DBS Land (DBSL) and Pidemco Land announced a merger to form a company eventually owning about $18 billion in assets, making it the largest listed property company in Southeast Asia when completed. Although this followed a new measure imposed by Monetary Authority of Singapore to separate financial and non-financial activities of banking groups on 21 June 2000, DBS Bank had already divested most of its investments in DBSL and was holding 5.4% of DBSL, well below the 20% shareholding threshold for non-core  banking activities under the new measure. More details of the merged entity were given on 31 July 2000. Named as CapitaLand on 6 September 2000, the merger was approved by shareholders on 18 October 2000 and was thus officially launched on 28 November 2000.

On 13 September 2012, CapitaLand announced that it was listed on the Dow Jones Sustainability Asia Pacific Index in recognition of its sustainability efforts. It has been listed on the Index since then.

On 14 January 2019, the Group announced that it would acquire Ascendas-Singbridge, a real estate group, from Temasek Holdings in an S$11b deal, which is approved by 90% of shareholders on 12 April 2019. The acquisition was completed on 30 June 2019.

On 20 February 2019, CapitaLand said that its 2018 net profit jumped 12.3%, the highest in a decade.

On 3 July 2019, it announced that Ascott Residence Trust (Ascott Reit) and Ascendas Hospitality Trust would be merged, forming Asia's largest hospitality trust with S$7.6b in combined assets. This comes after the successful acquisition of Ascendas-Singbridge on 30 June 2019.

On 29 September 2020, unitholders of CapitaLand Mall Trust and CapitaLand Commercial Trust voted in favour of the merger of both REITs to form CapitaLand Integrated Commercial Trust, which would become the largest Singapore REIT and one of the largest REITs in the Asia Pacific with an asset base of S$22.4 billion.

On 20 September 2021, CapitaLand Investment listed on the SGX, following the Group's proposed restructuring of its business to focus on investment management.

Group structure
Business Units by Geography
CapitaLand Singapore
CapitaLand China
CapitaLand India
CapitaLand Vietnam
CapitaLand International

Asset Operating Platforms
 Singapore Retail, Workspace Management and Data Centres
China Commercial Management
India Business Parks, Logistics and Data Centres
The Ascott Limited

CapitaLand Investment

CapitaLand Investment's footprint spans more than 200 cities in over 30 countries, with long-standing presence and real estate experience in core markets of Singapore, China and India. It currently manages six listed REITs and about 30 private funds.

Notable projects
CapitaLand's portfolio spans across diversified real estate classes which include integrated developments, retail, office, lodging, residential, business parks, industrial, logistics and data centres.

Integrated developments 
CapitaLand's integrated developments include ION Orchard and The Orchard Residences, Ascott Orchard Singapore and Cairnhill Nine, as well as Raffles City, its flagship brand of integrated developments. Pioneered in Singapore with the opening of Raffles City Singapore in 1986, there are now 10 other Raffles City developments in seven gateway cities in China, including the latest Raffles City The Bund and Raffles City Chongqing. One of CapitaLand's most recently completed developments is CapitaSpring (comprising an office tower and serviced residence), a 280m tall skyscraper in Raffles Place.

Shopping malls 
CapitaLand's retail portfolio spans Singapore, China, Malaysia, Japan, Cambodia and Vietnam. In Singapore, its 20 malls include Bedok Mall, Bugis Junction, Bugis+, Funan, IMM, ION Orchard, JCube, Plaza Singapura, Raffles City Singapore, Westgate, Jewel Changi Airport and Junction 8. It owns 46 malls in China, including CapitaMall Xizhimen in Beijing, CapitaMall Hongkou in Shanghai and Raffles City Shanghai, CapitaMall SKY+ in Guangzhou, Suzhou Center, and Raffles City Chongqing. Its portfolio in Malaysia and Japan includes Gurney Plaza and Queensbay Mall in Penang, Malaysia; and Olinas Mall in Tokyo.

In June 2019, CapitaLand, partnering with City Developments Limited (CDL), acquired Liang Court from mall operator AsiaMalls, an entity linked to PGIM Real Estate, for S$400 million. Before co-owning the mall with CDL, CapitaLand, via Ascott Residence Trust, owned and managed Somerset Liang Court Singapore, attached to Liang Court mall.

In November that same year, CapitaLand sold The Star Vista to co-owner Rock Productions for US$217 million. Currently, Rock Productions, owned by New Creation Church, is exploring possibilities for CapitaLand to continue operating and managing the mall on its behalf.

Lodging 
The Ascott Limited, a wholly owned subsidiary of CapitaLand, pioneered Asia Pacific's first international-class serviced residence with the opening of The Ascott Singapore in 1984. In 2006, it established the world's first Pan-Asian serviced residence REIT, Ascott Residence Trust. Today, the company's serviced residence brands include Ascott, Citadines, Oakwood, lyf, Quest, Somerset and The Crest Collection. It has more than 790 properties in over 200 cities across more than 30 countries in the Americas, Asia Pacific, Europe, the Middle East and Africa.

Offices 
CapitaLand's commercial spaces include Grade A offices and integrated developments across Singapore, China, Germany, Japan and Vietnam. Commercial office buildings in CapitaLand's portfolio include Asia Square Tower 2, Capital Tower, CapitaGreen, CapitaSpring, Six Battery Road, One George Street and Raffles City Tower in Singapore; Capital Square and Innov Center in Shanghai, China, as well as Main Airport Center and Gallileo in Frankfurt, Germany.

Homes 
CapitaLand's portfolio of residential developments include The Interlace, d’Leedon, Sky Vue and Sky Habitat. Recent redevelopments include the old Pearl Bank Apartments into the iconic One Pearl Bank, which is slated for completion in 2023; as well as CanningHill Piers on the site of the former Liang Court, scheduled for completion in 2025. CapitaLand's homes can be found in Singapore, China, Indonesia, Malaysia and Vietnam.

References

 
Real estate companies of Singapore
Housing in Singapore
Financial services companies of Singapore
Multinational companies headquartered in Singapore
Financial services companies established in 2000
2000 establishments in Singapore
Government-owned companies of Singapore
Temasek Holdings
Companies listed on the Singapore Exchange
Singaporean brands
Singaporean companies established in 2000